Jeff Rogers is a retired American soccer player.  He began his professional career in the Major Indoor Soccer League before playing in the American Indoor Soccer League and its successor, the National Professional Soccer League, as well as the American Professional Soccer League and USISL.

In 1983, Rogers attended San Diego State University, playing one season for the Aztecs.  On October 16, 1985, the Dallas Sidekicks of the Major Indoor Soccer League signed Rogers after spotting him in Phoenix, AZ while playing with an amateur team in an exhibition game against the Sidekicks. The Sidekicks released him on October 23, 1986. Rogers moved to Tampa Bay but was traded to the Milwaukee Wave of the American Indoor Soccer Association for one season. On December 21, 1989, Rogers signed with the Atlanta Attack.and was voted most improved player in the league in April 1990  In 1990, Rogers also turned to outdoor soccer when he joined the Arizona Condors of the American Professional Soccer League. He was named player of the week twice, and selected to the All League Second Team, finishing second in assists to Dominic Kinnear of the San Francisco Blackhawks. In 1991, he played for the Salt Lake Sting. In 1992 and 1993, he played for the Colorado Foxes winning back to back championships.  During the 1992-1993 indoor season, Rogers had his best statistical season, scoring forty-three goals in forty games for the Denver Thunder. In September 1993, Rogers was signed by the Kansas City Attack and suffered a season ending ACL tear 3 games into the season.  In May 1994, he was named the assistant coach with the Arizona Sandsharks of the Continental Indoor Soccer League. In 1994, Rogers returned to the Attack and amassed 164 points (57 goals, 50 assists) in 59 games over the course of two seasons. In May 1995, Rogers played for the Albany Alleycats in the USISL and was named as a first team all-star, leading Albany in Goals, Assists, and Total Points. In June 1995, the Tampa Bay Terror selected Rogers in the NPSL Expansion Draft, then traded him to the Baltimore Spirit for Jon Parry.  In October 1995, the Spirit sold Rogers' contract back to the Attack.  In May 1996, Rogers and Lee Tschantret argued with officials during game six of the NPSL finals. This led to Rogers' receiving a three-game suspension and undisclosed fine.  In June 1996, Rogers announced his retirement and subsequently returned to Tucson and co-founded the Tucson Soccer Academy in August 2000.

References

External links
 MISL: Jeff Rogers
 Tucson Soccer Academy: Jeff Rogers
 Dallas Sidekicks: Jeff Rogers

Living people
1964 births
Soccer players from Tucson, Arizona
Albany Alleycats players
American soccer coaches
American soccer players
American Indoor Soccer Association players
American Professional Soccer League players
Atlanta Attack players
Arizona Condors players
Arizona Sandsharks players
Dallas Sidekicks (original MISL) players
Denver Thunder players
Colorado Foxes players
Continental Indoor Soccer League players
Kansas City Attack players
Milwaukee Wave players
Major Indoor Soccer League (1978–1992) players
National Professional Soccer League (1984–2001) players
San Diego State Aztecs men's soccer players
Salt Lake Sting players
USISL players
Association football forwards 
Association football midfielders
Player-coaches
Continental Indoor Soccer League coaches